Savanes District is one of fourteen administrative districts of Ivory Coast. The district is located in the northernmost part of the country. The capital of the district is Korhogo.

Creation
Savanes District was created in a 2011 administrative reorganisation of the subdivisions of Ivory Coast. The territory of the district was composed of the former Savanes Region.

Administrative divisions
Savanes District is currently subdivided into three regions and the following departments:
 Bagoué Region (region seat in Boundiali)
 Boundiali Department
 Kouto Department
 Tengréla Department
 Poro Region (region seat also in Korhogo)
 Korhogo Department
 Sinématiali Department
 Dikodougou Department
 M'Bengué Department
 Tchologo Region (region seat in Ferkessédougou)
 Ferkessédougou Department
 Ouangolodougou Department
 Kong Department

Population
According to the 2021 census, Savanes District has a population of 2,159,434.
the population of Savanes is almost entirely muslim.

References

 
Districts of Ivory Coast
States and territories established in 2011